Stary Kurdym (İśke Kürźem) is a rural locality (a selo) and the administrative centre of Kurdymsky Selsoviet, Tatyshlinsky District, Bashkortostan, Russia. The population was 1,095 as of 2010. There are 13 streets.

Geography 
Stary Kurdym is located 27 km west of Verkhniye Tatyshly (the district's administrative centre) by road. Yurmiyazbash is the nearest rural locality.

References 

Rural localities in Tatyshlinsky District